Martino Megali (died 1656) was a Roman Catholic prelate who served as Bishop of Bova (1646–1656).

Biography
Martino Megali was born in San Mauro Marchesato, Italy. On 10 September 1646, Martino Megali was appointed during the papacy of Pope Innocent X as Bishop of Bova.
On 23 September 1646, he was consecrated bishop by Pier Luigi Carafa (seniore), Cardinal-Priest of Santi Silvestro e Martino ai Monti, with Alfonso Sacrati, Bishop Emeritus of Comacchio, and Ranuccio Scotti Douglas, Bishop of Borgo San Donnino, serving as co-consecrators. 
He served as Bishop of Bova until his death in July 1656.

References

External links and additional sources
 (for Chronology of Bishops) 
 (for Chronology of Bishops) 

17th-century Italian Roman Catholic bishops
People from the Province of Crotone
Bishops appointed by Pope Innocent X
1656 deaths